Xenochalepus is a genus of tortoise beetles and hispines in the family Chrysomelidae. There are more than 90 described species in Xenochalepus.

Species
These 95 species belong to the genus Xenochalepus:

 Xenochalepus ampliatus (Chapuis, 1877)
 Xenochalepus amplipennis (Baly, 1886)
 Xenochalepus angustus (Chapuis, 1877)
 Xenochalepus annulatus (Pic, 1931)
 Xenochalepus annulipes (Waterhouse, 1881)
 Xenochalepus apicipennis (Chapuis, 1877)
 Xenochalepus arcuatus Uhmann, 1940
 Xenochalepus assimilis Uhmann, 1947
 Xenochalepus ater (Weise, 1905)
 Xenochalepus atriceps (Chapuis, 1877)
 Xenochalepus bahianus Uhmann, 1942
 Xenochalepus bajulus Weise, 1911
 Xenochalepus bicostatus (Chapuis, 1877)
 Xenochalepus bilineatus (Chapuis, 1877)
 Xenochalepus bogotensis Weise, 1921
 Xenochalepus boliviensis (Pic, 1931)
 Xenochalepus brasiliensis (Pic, 1931)
 Xenochalepus cayennensis (Pic, 1931)
 Xenochalepus cephalotes (Chapuis, 1877)
 Xenochalepus chapuisi (Baly, 1886)
 Xenochalepus chromaticus (Baly, 1885)
 Xenochalepus contubernalis (Baly, 1885)
 Xenochalepus cruentus Uhmann, 1948
 Xenochalepus curticornis (Pic, 1931)
 Xenochalepus cyanura Blake, 1971
 Xenochalepus dentatus (Fabricius, 1787)
 Xenochalepus deyrollei (Chapuis, 1877)
 Xenochalepus dictyopterus (Perty, 1832)
 Xenochalepus dilaticornis (Pic, 1931)
 Xenochalepus discernendus Uhmann, 1940
 Xenochalepus discointerruptus (Pic, 1932)
 Xenochalepus diversipes (Pic, 1931)
 Xenochalepus donckieri (Pic, 1931)
 Xenochalepus erichsoni (Weise, 1905)
 Xenochalepus erythroderus (Chapuis, 1877)
 Xenochalepus faustus (Weise, 1905)
 Xenochalepus festivus Weise, 1911
 Xenochalepus fiebrigi Spaeth, 1937
 Xenochalepus firmus (Weise, 1910)
 Xenochalepus fraternalis (Baly, 1886)
 Xenochalepus frictus (Weise, 1905)
 Xenochalepus goyasensis (Pic, 1905)
 Xenochalepus gregalis (Pic, 1921)
 Xenochalepus guerini (Chapuis, 1877)
 Xenochalepus guyanensis (Spaeth, 1937)
 Xenochalepus haroldi (Chapuis, 1877)
 Xenochalepus hespenheidei Staines, 2000
 Xenochalepus holdhausi (Spaeth, 1937)
 Xenochalepus humerosus Uhmann, 1955
 Xenochalepus incisus Weise, 1911
 Xenochalepus jacobi Uhmann, 1937
 Xenochalepus kolbei Weise, 1911
 Xenochalepus longiceps (Pic, 1931)
 Xenochalepus maculicollis (Champion, 1894)
 Xenochalepus mediolineatus (Baly, 1886)
 Xenochalepus medius (Chapuis, 1877)
 Xenochalepus metallescens (Weise, 1905)
 Xenochalepus minarum Spaeth, 1937
 Xenochalepus monrosi Uhmann, 1951
 Xenochalepus mucunae Maulik, 1930
 Xenochalepus nigriceps (Blanchard, 1843)
 Xenochalepus nigripes (Weise, 1905)
 Xenochalepus notaticollis (Chapuis, 1877)
 Xenochalepus ocelliger Uhmann, 1940
 Xenochalepus octocostatus Weise, 1911
 Xenochalepus omoger (Crotch, 1873)
 Xenochalepus ornatus Weise, 1911
 Xenochalepus palmeri (Baly, 1886)
 Xenochalepus peruvianus (Weise, 1905)
 Xenochalepus phaseoli Uhmann, 1938
 Xenochalepus pictus Weise, 1911
 Xenochalepus platymeroides Uhmann, 1938
 Xenochalepus platymerus (Lucas, 1859)
 Xenochalepus potomacus Butte, 1968
 Xenochalepus pugillus (Spaeth, 1937)
 Xenochalepus rectefasciatus Pic, 1932
 Xenochalepus robiniae Butte, 1968
 Xenochalepus robustus (Pic, 1931)
 Xenochalepus rubripennis (Spaeth, 1937)
 Xenochalepus rubronotatus (Pic, 1931)
 Xenochalepus rufithorax (Baly, 1885)
 Xenochalepus serratus (Fabricius, 1787)
 Xenochalepus signaticollis (Baly, 1886)
 Xenochalepus suturata (Uhmann, 1957)
 Xenochalepus tandilensis (Bruch, 1933)
 Xenochalepus thoracicus (Fabricius, 1801)
 Xenochalepus transversalis (Chapuis, 1877)
 Xenochalepus trilineatus (Chapuis, 1877)
 Xenochalepus univittatus (Baly, 1886)
 Xenochalepus velutinus (Chapuis, 1877)
 Xenochalepus venezuelensis (Pic, 1931)
 Xenochalepus viridiceps (Pic, 1934)
 Xenochalepus vittatipennis (Spaeth, 1937)
 Xenochalepus waterhousei (Baly, 1886)
 Xenochalepus weisei Spaeth, 1937

References

Further reading

 
 
 
 
 

Cassidinae
Articles created by Qbugbot